Johann Adam Hartmann (1748-1836) was a German born trapper and frontiersman in New York State. Some consider him as a possible inspiration for Natty Bumpo, the main character in James Fenimore Cooper's Leatherstocking Tales.

Hartmann was born in Edenkoben, Palatinate (Germany) in 1748. His parents were Anna Maria Scholl, a native of Edenkoben and Johann Hartmann, a weaver who was originally from Switzerland. The couple married in 1737. Hartman left his hometown at the age of 16 to travel on the ship Boston from Rotterdam to Philadelphia. From there he moved to Upstate New York where he lived as frontiersman, trapper and hunter. When the American Revolutionary War broke out in 1775 Hartmann joined the American side and served as ranger at Fort Dayton. He participated in the Battle of Oriskany, where he got wounded by a shot. One description of his war time career goes as follows:

After the war Hartmann stayed in Herkimer County and lived of a disability pension, that he received as a veteran of the revolution. He died on April 5, 1836.

The Leatherstocking Tales (German: Lederstrumpf) were hugely popular in Germany and in 1934 Carl Suesser published an article in Westermanns Monatshefte in which he suggested that Cooper might have been inspired by Hartmann when he created the character of Natty Bumpo. Alfred H. Kuby pointed out in 1983, that Cooper has mentioned Hartmann in the first edition of The Pioneers (1823) and that during his travels in Europe Cooper had spent some time in the region where Hartmann was born.

The city of Edenkoben dedicated a plaque to Hartmann on the occasion of the 175th anniversary of the Battle of Oriskany. Due to some computation error, that only got discovered after the plaque had been set up, it contains the wrong year of birth, 1743 instead of 1748. The German sculptor Gernot Rumpf designed a fountain for  the city of Edenkoben, which was completed in 1990. The Lederstrumpfbrunnen (lit. Leatherstocking fountain) features three major statues of figures related to the Leatherstocking Tales, one of them is a statue of Hartmann/Bumpo displayed with a hunting rifle and a dog.

External links 
Im Wilden Westen der Pfalz - report on the German radio broadcaster SR 3 Saarlandwelle on May 12, 2005 (German)

Notes 

German emigrants to the United States
German hunters
1748 births
1836 deaths